Donald Luther Birx is an American physicist and academic administrator serving as the 15th president of Plymouth State University. Prior to assuming office on July 31, 2015, Birx was an administrator at Pennsylvania State University, the University of Houston System, and the New Mexico State University.

Early life and education 
Birx was born in Pennsylvania, the son of Donald Birx Sr., a mathematician and electrical engineer, and Adele Birx (née Sparks), a nursing instructor. His younger sister, Deborah Birx, is a physician and diplomat. His brother, Daniel "Danny" Birx, died in a plane crash in 2000. Birx earned a Bachelor of Science degree in engineering physics from the University of California, Berkeley, a Master of Science in physics and Master of Business Administration from Miami University, and a PhD in electrical engineering and artificial intelligence from the University of Dayton.

Career 
Birx began his career at Systems Research Laboratories, Inc., where he was a senior research scientist, principal investigator, and general manager of the intelligent systems division. He then relocated to Las Cruces, New Mexico, where he became a professor of physics and interim vice president for research at New Mexico State University. Birx later worked as the vice chancellor and vice president for research of University of Houston System. Prior to his tenure at Plymouth State University, Birx was the chancellor of Penn State Erie, The Behrend College.

In May 2015 trustees of the University System of New Hampshire announced that Birx had been selected to serve as the 15th president of Plymouth State University, succeeding Sara Jayne Steen. He assumed office on July 31, 2015.

References 

Scientists from Pennsylvania
New Mexico State University faculty
University of Houston System people
Plymouth State University people
Pennsylvania State University faculty
UC Berkeley College of Engineering alumni
Miami University alumni
University of Dayton alumni
Living people
Year of birth missing (living people)